In mathematics, Vinberg's algorithm is an algorithm, introduced by Ernest Borisovich Vinberg, for finding a fundamental domain of a hyperbolic reflection group.

 used Vinberg's algorithm to describe the automorphism group of the 26-dimensional even unimodular Lorentzian lattice II25,1 in terms of the Leech lattice.

Description of the algorithm
Let  be a hyperbolic reflection group. Choose any point ; we shall call it the basic (or initial) point.
Let  be the faces of this cone, and let  be outer normal vectors to it. Consider the half-spaces 

Its faces containing  are formed by faces  of the cone . The other faces  and the corresponding outward normals  are constructed by induction. Namely, for  we take a mirror such that the root  orthogonal to it satisfies the conditions

(1) ;

(2)  for all ;

(3) the distance  is minimum subject to constraints (1) and (2).

References

Hyperbolic geometry
Reflection groups